Bedford County is a county in the Commonwealth of Pennsylvania. As of the 2020 census, the population was 47,577. The county seat is Bedford.

History

18th century

In 1750, Robert MacRay, a Scots-Irish immigrant, opened the first trading post in Raystown (which is now Bedford) on the land that is now Bedford County. The early Anglo-American settlers had a difficult time dealing with raids from Native Americans. In 1754 fierce fighting erupted as Native Americans became allied with the British or French in the North American front, known as the French and Indian War, of the Seven Years' War between those nations in Europe.

In 1759, after the capture of Fort Duquesne in Allegheny County, on the Allegheny and Monongahela rivers, English colonists built a road between the fort (which was renamed as Fort Pitt) to the newly built Fort Bedford in Raystown. The English defeated the French in the war and took over their territories in North America east of the Mississippi River. Treaties with the Indians opened more land for future peaceful settlement.

This road followed and improved on ancient Indian trails. In later years it was widened and paved as "Forbes Road"; it is now Route 30. When the Pennsylvania Turnpike was built, this interstate toll road became the main highway through Bedford County.

Bedford County was created on March 9, 1771, from part of Cumberland County and named in honor of Fort Bedford. The 1767 Mason–Dixon line had stabilized the southern border with Maryland. In the aftermath of the American Revolution, the population increased largely due to emigration. Within a lifetime Old Bedford County was greatly reduced from its original boundaries. Huntingdon County was created on September 20, 1787, mainly from the north part of Bedford County, plus an addition of territory on the east (Big Valley, Tuscarora Valley) from Cumberland County. Somerset County was created from part of Bedford County on April 17, 1795. Centre was created on February 13, 1800, from parts of Huntingdon, Lycoming, Mifflin, and Northumberland counties. Cambria County was created on March 26, 1804, from parts of Bedford, Huntingdon, and Somerset Counties. Blair County was created on February 26, 1846, from parts of Huntingdon and Bedford Counties. Finally Fulton County was created on April 19, 1850, from part of Bedford County, setting the county at its current boundaries.

The land was developed into lush farms with woodlands. It was developed as a trading center on the way to Pittsburgh and farther west of Pennsylvania. In 1794, President George Washington came to the county in response to the Whiskey Rebellion.

19th century
In the late 19th century, the Bedford Springs Hotel became an important site for wealthy vacationers. It was built near natural springs that had been important to the Native Americans for hundreds of years. During the administration of President James Buchanan, he moved much of his administration to the hotel, which became the informal summer White House.  The U.S. Supreme Court met at the hotel once.  It was the only time that the high court met outside of the capital.

During the late 19th century, the county had a population boom, with the number of people doubling between 1870 and 1890. Railroads constructed through the town connected the county with the mining industry. The story of the Lost Children of the Alleghenies originates from Blue Knob State Park in the county.

Geography
It has a humid continental climate (Dfa/Dfb) and average monthly temperatures in Bedford borough range from 28.1 °F in January to 72.0 °F in July.

Features
Evitts Mountain
Morrison Cove
Tussey Mountain
Blue Knob, highest mountain in the county at approximately

Adjacent counties
Blair County (north)
Huntingdon County (northeast)
Fulton County (east)
Allegany County, Maryland (south)
Somerset County (west)
Cambria County (northwest)

Geology

Bedford County is situated along the western border of the Ridge and Valley physiographic province, which is characterized by folded and faulted sedimentary rocks of early to middle Paleozoic age. The northwestern border of the county is approximately at the Allegheny Front, a geological boundary between the Ridge and Valley Province and the Allegheny Plateau (characterized by relatively flat-lying sedimentary rocks of late Paleozoic age).

The stratigraphic record of sedimentary rocks within the county spans from the Cambrian Warrior Formation to the Pennsylvanian Conemaugh Group (in the Broad Top area).  No igneous or metamorphic rocks of any kind exist within the county.

The primary mountains within the county (From west to east: Wills, Evitts, Dunning, and Tussey mountains) extend from the southern border with Maryland to the northeast into Blair County, and are held up by the Silurian Tuscarora Formation, made of quartz sandstone and conglomerate.  Chestnut Ridge is a broad anticline held up by the Devonian Ridgeley Member of the Old Port Formation, also made of sandstone and conglomerate.  Broad Top, located north of Breezewood, is a plateau of relatively flat-lying rocks that are stratigraphically higher, and thus younger (Mississippian and Pennsylvanian), than most of the other rocks within the county (Cambrian through Devonian).  Broad Top extends into Huntingdon County to the north and Fulton County to the east.

The Raystown Branch of the Juniata River is the main drainage in the northern two-thirds of the county.  The river flows to the east through the mountains within the county through several water gaps caused by a group of faults trending east–west through the central part of the county.  The river then turns north and flows into Raystown Lake in Huntingdon County.  The southern third of the county is drained by several tributaries of the Potomac River.  Both the Potomac and Juniata rivers are part of the Chesapeake Bay Watershed.

Several limestone quarries exist in Bedford County, most of which are owned and operated by New Enterprise Stone and Lime Company.  Quarry locations include Ashcom, New Paris, Kilcoin, and Sproul.

Two coal fields exist within Bedford County.  One is the Broad Top Field in the northeastern corner of the county, and the other is the Georges Creek Field along the southwestern border. Both fields contain bituminous coal.  There are abandoned mines in both areas and acid mine drainage is an environmental problem in the Broad Top area, where several fishless streams exist as a result of the discharge from the abandoned mines.

Natural gas fields and storage areas exist in southeastern Bedford County, primarily within folded Devonian rocks south of Breezewood.  Another deep gas field exists in the vicinity of Blue Knob on the border with Blair County to the north.

Law and government

County Commissioners
Barry L. Dallara, Chairman (Republican)
Deb Baughman, Vice Chairwoman (Democratic)
Alan Frederick, Secretary (Republican)

State Senate
 Wayne Langerholc, Republican, Pennsylvania's 35th Senatorial District

State House of Representatives
 Jesse Topper, Republican, Pennsylvania's 78th Representative District
 Carl Walker Metzgar, Republican, Pennsylvania's 69th Representative District

United States House of Representatives
 John Joyce, Republican, Pennsylvania's 13th congressional district

United States Senate
John Fetterman, Democrat
Bob Casey, Democrat

Politics

Bedford County is overwhelmingly Republican, with that party winning the vote of nearly all presidential elections, recently by great margins. In 2016 and 2020, it was Donald Trump’s second strongest county in Pennsylvania, only after neighboring Fulton County.

|}

As of May 2021, there are 32,662 registered voters in Bedford County.

 Democratic: 6,603 (20.21%)
 Republican: 23,013 (70.46%)
 Libertarian: 131 (0.40%)
 Green: 16 (0.05%)
 Other/No Party Affiliation: 2,899 (8.88%)

Demographics

As of the census of 2010, there were 49,762 people, 20,233 households, and 14,251 families residing in the county.  The population density was 49 people per square mile (19/km2).  There were 23,954 housing units at an average density of 23 per square mile (9/km2).  The racial makeup of the county was 98.0% White, 0.5% Black or African American, 0.2% Native American, 0.2% Asian, 0.0% Pacific Islander, 0.3% from other races, and 0.8% from two or more races.  0.9% of the population were Hispanic or Latino of any race.

There were 20,233 households, out of which 28.8% had children under the age of 18 living with them, 57.5% were married couples living together, 8.2% had a female householder with no husband present, and 29.6% were non-families. 25.7% of all households were made up of individuals, and 12.5% had someone living alone who was 65 years of age or older.  The average household size was 2.43 and the average family size was 2.90.

In the county, the population was spread out, with 21.6% under the age of 18, 7.0% from 18 to 24, 23.0% from 25 to 44, 29.4% from 45 to 64, and 19.0% who were 65 years of age or older.  The median age was 43.9 years. For every 100 females age 18 and over, there were 96.2 males.

2020 Census

Education

Public school districts
 Bedford Area School District
 Chestnut Ridge School District
 Claysburg-Kimmel School District (also in Blair County)
 Everett Area School District
 Northern Bedford County School District
 Tussey Mountain School District (also in Huntingdon County)

Public Charter Schools
 HOPE for Hyndman Charter School, Hyndman

Pennsylvania resident students may also attend any of the Commonwealth's 13 public cyber charter schools which provide instruction via computers and the Internet.

Public Vo Tech School
Bedford County Technical Center

Private schools
 Allegheny Valley Christian School, Schellsburg
 Christian Light School, Bedford
 Dry Hill Parochial School, Woodbury
 Friends Cove Mennonite School, Bedford
 Global Power Line Academy, Claysburg
 Golden Rule School, Martinsburg
 Learning Lamp at Everett, Everett
 Little Learning Lamp
 Lone Oak Mennonite School, New Enterprise
 Noahs Ark Kindergarten, New Park
 Snake Spring Valley Christian Academy, Inc, Everett
 South Cove Parochial School, New Enterprise
 Saint Thomas School, Bedford, Pennsylvania, Bedford
 Sunny Slope School, Woodbury
 Woodbury Mennonite School, Woodbury

Colleges or university
 Allegany College of Maryland campus in Everett
As reported in ED Names and Places directory maintained by the Pennsylvania Department of Education August 2015

Transportation

Major highways

Airports
Bedford County Airport is a public use airport in Bedford County. It is owned by the Bedford County Airport Authority and is located four nautical miles (7.4 km) north of the central business district of the borough of Bedford, Pennsylvania.

Recreation
There are three Pennsylvania state parks in Bedford County:

Blue Knob State Park, site of the Blue Knob All Seasons Resort
Shawnee State Park
Warriors Path State Park
The largest borough-owned park in the county is a 77-acre community park in Everett - open to the public and available for events. Mid State Trail and Great Eastern Trail pass through Everett and Tenley Park.
Tenley Park

Communities

Under Pennsylvania law, there are four types of incorporated municipalities: cities, boroughs, townships, and, in only one case (Bloomsburg, Columbia County), towns. The following boroughs and townships are located in Bedford County:

Boroughs
Bedford (county seat)
Coaldale
Everett
Hopewell
Hyndman
Manns Choice
New Paris
Pleasantville
Rainsburg
St. Clairsville
Saxton
Schellsburg
Woodbury

Townships

Bedford
Bloomfield
Broad Top
Colerain
Cumberland Valley
East Providence
East St. Clair
Harrison
Hopewell
Juniata
Kimmel
King
Liberty
Lincoln
Londonderry
Mann
Monroe
Napier
Pavia
Snake Spring
South Woodbury
Southampton
West Providence
West St. Clair
Woodbury

Census-designated places
Alumbank
Defiance
Earlston
Stonerstown

Population ranking
The population ranking of the following table is based on the 2010 census of Bedford County.

† county seat

See also
  National Register of Historic Places listings in Bedford County, Pennsylvania

References

 "THE KERNEL OF GREATNESS: An Informal Bicentennial History of Bedford County (Pennsylvania)", by Bedford County Heritage Commission (Author), B/W Illus (Illustrator), 1971, ASIN B000KYDYOE

External links

 
1771 establishments in Pennsylvania
Counties of Appalachia
Populated places established in 1771